Sparkling Fox (translit. Huo Ho) is a 1994 drama film directed by Wu Ziniu. It was entered into the 44th Berlin International Film Festival where it won an Honourable Mention.

Cast
 Gong Hanlin
 Tu Men

References

External links

1994 films
Hong Kong drama films
Chinese-language films
1994 drama films
Films directed by Wu Ziniu
1990s Hong Kong films